Gareth Gwenlan  (26 April 1937 – 8 May 2016) was a Welsh television producer, director and executive, best known for his work on shows such as The Fall and Rise of Reginald Perrin, Butterflies, To the Manor Born, Only Fools and Horses and High Hopes. Gwenlan was appointed Officer of the Order of the British Empire in the 2013 Birthday Honours for services to broadcasting.

Early life
Gwenlan was born at Tydfil Lodge, Merthyr Tydfil on 26 April 1937 though his birth was registered at Brecon. His father, Charles Aneuryn Gwenlan and his mother, Mary, née Francis were both teachers.

Gwenlan attended Vaynor and Penderyn High School, Cefn Coed, and for his National Service he joined the RAF in Cyprus. In 1960 he began his acting training at Rose Bruford College of Speech and Drama in Sidcup and continued at the York Theatre Royal.

Career
Gwenlan began his BBC television career as an assistant floor manager and production assistant in the drama department, working on series such as Doctor Who. He subsequently moved into comedy, producing series such as The Fall and Rise of Reginald Perrin, Butterflies and To the Manor Born. In 1983 he was appointed Head of BBC Comedy, a position he held until 1990. He directed the sitcom Double First (1988). In 1988 he succeeded Ray Butt as the producer of Only Fools and Horses, remaining with the series until it finished in 2003.

Gwenlan famously rejected the sitcom Red Dwarf (in his capacity as Head of Comedy), stating that the sitcom would only work if there was 'a sofa in the spacecraft'. This is the reason that the name 'Gwenlan' was appropriated in the first series as a future swearword.

Personal life
Gwenlan married three times: to Valerie Bonner, an artist, on 21 April 1962 in York and they had a child together. On 14 February 1986 he married  Sarah Elizabeth Fanghanel, a personal assistant in Gwenlan. He had another child from a separate relationship. His final marriage was to Gail Susan Evans on 9 September 2000 in Putley where they lived until his death due to metatastic esophageal cancer on 8 May 2016.

References

External links

1937 births
2016 deaths
20th-century Royal Air Force personnel
Alumni of Rose Bruford College
BBC executives
BBC television producers
Officers of the Order of the British Empire
People from Brecon
Welsh television directors
Welsh television producers